is an original Japanese anime television series produced by J.C.Staff, created by Gorō Taniguchi, and directed by Toshinori Fukushima. The series aired from January 10 to March 28, 2021.

Plot
The series will follow a group of high school boys who participate in a fictional type of competitive figure skating known as “skate-leading”. After suffering a humiliating loss to his (unrequited) rival, Maeshima Kensei swears off figure skating at the young age of 11. Fast-forward five years, and he's going nowhere in school or in life, sought after by all manner of sports teams but committed to none--until he learns his former not-rival now-skating-legend Shinozaki Reo has switched from singles skating to the new team-oriented skating style of 'Skate Leading'. He then with help of Shinozaki's half-brother Hayato Sasugai, who holds enmity towards Shinozaki, and members of skate leading club of Ionodai High School joins the competition against Shinozaki.

Characters

Ionodai High School

St Cavis Gakuen High School

Yokohama Super Global High School

Chutei University Kamimaezu High School

Media

Manga
In March 2020, a manga adaption by Chiaki Nagaoka with art by Sumika Sumio was announced to run in Monthly G Fantasy. It began serialization on December 18, 2020.

Anime
On December 1, 2019, J.C.Staff announced that they are producing a new original anime television series directed by Gorō Taniguchi, with Toboso Yana handling original character designs. The series is directed by Toshinori Fukushima, with Gorō Taniguchi serving as chief director. Noboru Kimura is writing the scripts, Yoko Ito is designing the characters, and Ryō Takahashi is composing the series' music. The series was originally set to premiere in July 2020, but it was delayed to January 2021 due to the COVID-19 pandemic. The series aired from January 10 to March 28, 2021. Funimation licensed the series and started streaming it on December 27, 2020, two weeks before its Japanese broadcast, in North America and the British Isles, in Europe through Wakanim, and in Australia and New Zealand through AnimeLab. On March 13, 2021, Funimation announced the series would receive an English dub, with the first episode premiering the next day.

Episode list

Notes

References

External links
Anime official website 

2021 anime television series debuts
Anime postponed due to the COVID-19 pandemic
Anime with original screenplays
Crunchyroll anime
Figure skating in anime and manga
Gangan Comics manga
J.C.Staff
Medialink
Shōnen manga